Western Samoa competed at the 1996 Summer Olympics in Atlanta, United States.

Results by event

Athletics
Men's Discus Throw 
 Chris Mene
 Qualification — 51.28m (→ did not advance)

Women's Javelin Throw
 Iloai Suaniu
 Qualification — 38.08m (→ did not advance)

Boxing
Men's Middleweight (75 kg)
Bob Gasio
 First Round — Lost to Ricardo Rodríguez (Brazil), 4-11

Men's Light Heavyweight (81 kg)
Samuela Leu
 First Round — Lost to Lee Seung-bae (South Korea), 0-14

Weightlifting
Men's Middleweight (76 kg)
Ofisa Ofisa 18th (out of 24 competitors)
Snatch 127.5 kg, Clean & Jerk 160 kg, Total 287.5 kg

References
Official Olympic Reports

Nations at the 1996 Summer Olympics
1996
1996 in Samoan sport